Naphaswan Yangpaiboon (12 May 1988, Chiang Mai) is a Thai sport shooter. At the 2012 Summer Olympics, she competed in the Women's 10 metre air pistol and the women's 25 metre pistol. She lost to Rahi Sarnobat in the finals of the women's 25 metre pistol at the 2018 Asian Games and bagged a silver.

References

Naphaswan Yangpaiboon
Living people
Naphaswan Yangpaiboon
Shooters at the 2012 Summer Olympics
Naphaswan Yangpaiboon
Shooters at the 2010 Asian Games
Shooters at the 2014 Asian Games
Shooters at the 2018 Asian Games
Medalists at the 2018 Asian Games
Asian Games medalists in shooting
Naphaswan Yangpaiboon
Universiade medalists in shooting
1988 births
Universiade silver medalists for Thailand
Southeast Asian Games medalists in shooting
Medalists at the 2015 Summer Universiade
Shooters at the 2020 Summer Olympics
Naphaswan Yangpaiboon